Koinonia Christian Fellowship is a church in Bloomingdale, Ontario. According to their own statements they are " a body of believers whose goal is to passionately pursue Koinonia" with God the Father, Son, and Holy Spirit, to develop and demonstrate Koinonia with one another through covenant relationship, and to expand their "Koinonia" and extend God's heart to the world by reaching the lost through personal and corporate evangelism". 

Koinonia was founded in 1984 in Waterloo, Ontario. The church first met in the Waterloo Inn before relocating in 1986 to its present location in Bloomingdale.  Since that time, both property and facilities have been expanded. 

In 1993, Koinonia Christian Academy was established accommodating children from Junior Kindergarten through high school. Both the church and the school continue to thrive and grow.

Ministries include Kidzone Urban Ministries, Impact Youth Ministries and Twenty20 Young Adults Ministry.

External links
Official website

Christian organizations established in 1984
Non-denominational Evangelical churches
1984 establishments in Ontario
Evangelicalism in Canada